The 2012–13 Ekstraklasa or T-Mobile Ekstraklasa for sponsorship reasons, was the 79th season of the highest level of football leagues in Poland since its establishment in 1927. It began on 17 August 2012 and concluded on 2 June 2013. A total of 16 teams are participating, 14 of which competed in the league during the 2011–12 season, while the remaining two were promoted from the I Liga. Each team played a total of 30 matches, half at home and half away.

Śląsk Wrocław were the defending champions, winning their 2nd title last season, first since the 1976–77 season.

Śląsk Wrocław as reigning champions entered the 2nd qualifying round of the 2012–13 UEFA Champions League. Śląsk defeated the Montenegrin champions Budućnost Podgorica 2–1 on aggregate, but got eliminated in the third qualifying round by the Swedish champions Helsingborg IF 1–6 on aggregate.

Ruch Chorzów, as the runner-up, entered the 2nd qualifying round of the 2012-13 UEFA Europa League, in which they defeated the Macedonian league runners-up Metalurg Skopje 6–1 on aggregate. Ruch got eliminated in the next round by the Czech side Viktoria Plzeň 0–7 on aggregate.

Legia Warsaw whom won the 2011–12 Polish Cup, as well as finishing third last season also qualified for the 2nd qualifying of the Europa League. Legia defeated the Latvian league runner-up Liepājas Metalurgs 7–3 on aggregate. In the third round Legia defeated the Austrian side SV Ried 4–3 on aggregate. Legia were defeated in the Play-off round by the Norwegian side Rosenborg BK 2–3 on aggregate.

Lech Poznań as the fourth placed team earned a place in the 1st qualifying round of the Europa League, since Legia Warsaw won the Polish Cup. Lech first defeated the Kazakh side FC Zhetysu 3–1 on aggregate, in the next round they defeated the Azerbaijani side Khazar Lankaran 2–1 on aggregate. Lech got eliminated in the third round, losing to Swedish side AIK Fotboll 1–3 on aggregate.

On May 15, 2013, the Polish FA announced that Polonia Warsaw won't receive the Ekstraklasa license for 2013–14 season, citing financial issues. The club's appeal was rejected on May 28. As a result, Polonia was relegated to 2013–14 I Liga instead of the 15th placed Ekstraklasa team.

The Polish FA also deemed GKS, Widzew, Pogoń, Polonia and Ruch (financial issues) as well as Podbeskidzie and Jagiellonia (infrastructural reasons) ineligible to compete in UEFA competitions. Śląsk and Wisła, although initially denied the licence due to submitting incomplete financial forecasts, were able to fulfil the requirements during the appeal procedure and received the UEFA licence. Also, the FA's decision to exclude Górnik from the European competitions was cancelled, as the club, whose home stadium is undergoing renovative work, has made arrangements to use another venue as their home field in the event of their qualification to the 2013–14 Europa League. The three clubs were instead fined 100,000 zł (Śląsk), and 20,000 zł (both Wisła and Górnik).

Teams
Promotion and relegation as usual was determined by the position in the table from prior season. The bottom two teams were directly relegated to the I Liga, while the top two teams are promoted to the Ekstraklasa.

ŁKS Łódź and Cracovia finished in 15th and 16th place, respectively, and were directly relegated to the Polish First League as a result. ŁKS Łódź returned to the second tier after just being promoted from the season before. Cracovia spent 8 consecutive seasons in the Ekstraklasa, after returning to the top division for the 2004–05 season.

Promotion was won by 2011–12 I Liga champions Piast Gliwice, who returned to the top division after being relegated in the 2009–10 season. Pogoń Szczecin finished as runners-up in the I Liga and made their comeback to the top tier after 5 years in lower divisions.

Stadiums and locations

1. Upgrading to 31,871.
2. Upgrading to 22,400.
3. Upgrading to 15,200.

Personnel and kits

Note: Flags indicate national team as has been defined under FIFA eligibility rules. Players and Managers may hold more than one non-FIFA nationality.

1. On the back of shirt.
2. Lech Poznań makes a donation to wygrajzycie.pl (it's a charity website) in order to display the charity's logo on the club's kit.
3  On the left sleeve.
Puma is the official ball supplier for Ekstraklasa.

Managerial changes

League table

Positions by round

The following table represents the teams position after each round in the competition.

Results

Season statistics

Top goalscorers

Top assists

Clean sheets

References

External links
 

Ekstraklasa seasons
Poland
1